Proof by intimidation (or argumentum verbosum) is a jocular phrase used mainly in mathematics to refer to a specific form of hand-waving, whereby one attempts to advance an argument by marking it as obvious or trivial, or by giving an argument loaded with jargon and obscure results. It attempts to intimidate the audience into simply accepting the result without evidence, by appealing to their ignorance and lack of understanding.

The phrase is often used when the author is an authority in their field, presenting their proof to people who respect a priori the author's insistence of the validity of the proof, while in other cases, the author might simply claim that their statement is true because it is trivial or because they say so. Usage of this phrase is for the most part in good humour, though it can also appear in serious criticism. A proof by intimidation is often associated with phrases such as:

 "Clearly..."
 "It is self-evident that..."
 "It can be easily shown that..."
 "... does not warrant a proof."
 "The proof is left as an exercise for the reader."

Outside mathematics, "proof by intimidation" is also cited by critics of junk science, to describe cases in which scientific evidence is thrown aside in favour of dubious arguments—such as those presented to the public by articulate advocates who pose as experts in their field.

In a memoir, Gian-Carlo Rota claimed that the expression "proof by intimidation" was coined by Mark Kac, to describe a technique used by William Feller in his lectures:

See also

References

Professional humor
Mathematical proofs
In-jokes
Mathematical humor
English phrases